Dynic may refer to:

 Dynic Corporation, a Japanese company
 Dynic Astronomical Observatory, an astronomical observatory in Japan